A multidrop bus (MDB) is a computer bus in which all components are connected to the electrical circuit. A process of arbitration determines which device sends information at any point. The other devices listen for the data they are intended to receive.

Multidrop buses have the advantage of simplicity and extensibility, but their differing electrical characteristics make them relatively unsuitable for high frequency or high bandwidth applications.

In computing
Since 2000, multidrop standards such as PCI and Parallel ATA are increasingly being replaced by point-to-point systems such as PCI Express and SATA. Modern SDRAM chips exemplify the problem of electrical impedance discontinuity. Fully Buffered DIMM is an alternative approach to connecting multiple DRAM modules to a memory controller.

For vending machines

MDB/ICP

MDB/ICP (formerly known as MDB) is a multidrop bus computer networking protocol used within the vending machine industry, currently published by the American National Automatic Merchandising Association.

ccTalk

The ccTalk multidrop bus protocol uses an  TTL-level asynchronous serial protocol. It uses address randomization to allow multiple similar devices on the bus (after randomisation the devices can be distinguished by their serial number). ccTalk was developed by CoinControls, but is used by multiple vendors.

See also
 Bus network topology
 EIA-485
 1-Wire
 Open collector

External links
IBM Journal of Research and Development

Computer buses